Kożuszkowo  is a village in the administrative district of Gmina Jeziora Wielkie, within Mogilno County, Kuyavian-Pomeranian Voivodeship, in north-central Poland.

Notable persons
 John Mojecki - Polish activist on Staten Island

References

Villages in Mogilno County